Leipzig Nord is a railway station located in Leipzig, Germany. The station opened on 15 December 2013 and is located on the Dessau-Leipzig railway. Train services are operated by Deutsche Bahn, as part of the S-Bahn Mitteldeutschland.

Train services
The following services currently call at the station:

Tram services
1
9

References

External links
 

Nord
Leipzig Nord